The Feminist Press (officially The Feminist Press at CUNY) is an American independent nonprofit literary publisher  of feminist literature that promotes freedom of expression and social justice. It publishes writing by people who share an activist spirit and a belief in choice and equality. Founded in 1970 to challenge sexual stereotypes in books, schools and libraries, the press began by rescuing “lost” works by writers such as Zora Neale Hurston, Charlotte Perkins Gilman and Rebecca Harding Davis, and established its publishing program with books by American writers of diverse racial and class backgrounds. Since then it has also been bringing works from around the world to North American readers. The Feminist Press is the longest surviving women's publishing house in the world. The press operates out of the Graduate Center at the City University of New York (CUNY).

Founding and history 
By the end of the 1960s, both Florence Howe and her then husband Paul Lauter had taught in the Freedom Schools in Mississippi, and Howe was already attempting to compile a women's studies curriculum for her writing students at Goucher College in Baltimore. As the 1970s approached, Howe was convinced that, just as she needed texts for teaching about women, so would other educators. Her initial appeal to a number of university and trade publishers to issue a series of critical feminist biographies proved of no avail. Ultimately, the Baltimore Women's Liberation, an active local group and publishers of a successful new journal, helped to raise money for the press's first publications. On November 17, 1970, the first meeting of the newly formed press was held in Florence Howe's living room. The first book to be published was Barbara Danish's children's book The Dragon and the Doctor in 1971. Howe saw her dreams of producing feminist biographies come true with the publication of Elizabeth Barrett Browning at the end of 1971.

In the press's founding years, Tillie Olsen changed its course dramatically by giving Howe a photocopy of the 1861 pages of The Atlantic Monthly containing Rebecca Harding Davis's anonymously published novella Life in the Iron Mills. In 1972, the press issued this work by Rebecca Harding Davis as the first of its series of rediscovered feminist literary classics. Olsen's second suggestion, Daughter of Earth by Agnes Smedley, and Elaine Hedges’s suggestion, The Yellow Wallpaper by Charlotte Perkins Gilman, were published in 1973. Both have become staples of American literature and women's studies curriculums since, with the 1990 Norton Anthology of American Literature including both Life in the Iron Mills and The Yellow Wallpaper.

In the spring of 1971, Howe and her husband moved to New York, where she brought the burgeoning Press to her newly accepted professorship at the State University of New York (SUNY)/Old Westbury. The president of the school, who was interested in bringing women's studies programs to the college, allowed Howe to operate out of the corridor of one of the buildings. The press was met with excitement and support from students who worked in the small office in exchange for college work-study. Two New York City publishing professionals, Verne Moberg and Susan Lowes, contributed to the publication of three volumes of reprinted fiction released in 1972 and 1973, which Howe believed to exemplify the press's enduring commitment to producing course-adoptable books to supplement curriculums dominated by male writers.

In 1972, the Feminist Press became a 501(c)3 organization with tax-exempt status and in 1975, the press moved into its own headquarters in a separate house on campus, a cottage which had been faculty apartments and a garage. The Feminist Press was committed to creating a democratic workplace where staff served on the board which made all publishing and policy decisions. In addition, all paid staff received equal salaries and served on committees including editorial, finance, and marketing & distribution.

The press continued its innovative program of publishing work in three categories: feminist biographies, reprints of important works by women writers, and nonsexist children's books. For each category, the press enlisted advisory committees of distinguished feminist writers, scholars, and educators. The Reprints Advisory Committee was established in 1973 with Founding members including Roslyn Baxandall, Mari Jo Buhle, Ellen DuBois, Florence Howe, Paul Lauter, Laurie Olsen, Lillian Robinson, Deborah S. Rosenfelt, Elaine Showalter, and Catharine Stimpson.

In 1973, the press received funding from the Rockefeller Foundation to survey secondary school textbooks in English and history and to plan for a project to develop supplementary texts. In 1975, the press received two major grants from the Ford Foundation and the Carnegie Corporation to begin what became a seven-year project – Women's Lives/Women's Work, a groundbreaking series of 12 books and teaching guides to supplement high school English and Social Studies texts. The series was co-published by the Feminist Press and McGraw-Hill's Webster Division. During the life of the project, the books and teaching guides were extensively tested and evaluated by teachers in schools all across the country.

Books in the Women's Lives/Women's Work series, alphabetically by author:

 Cantarow, Ellen with O’Malley, Susan Gushee; Strom, Sharon Hartman (1980). Moving the Mountain: Women Working for Social Change. Old Westbury, New York: The Feminist Press; New York: McGraw-Hill. .
 Elsasser, Nan; MacKenzie, Kyle; Tixier y Vigil, Yvonne, eds. (1980) Las Mujeres: Conversations from a Hispanic Community Old Westbury, New York: The Feminist Press; New York: McGraw-Hill. .
 Hedges, Elaine; Wendt, Ingrid, eds. (1980) In Her Own Image: Women Working in the Arts Old Westbury, New York: The Feminist Press; New York: McGraw-Hill. .
 Hoffman, Nancy, ed. (1981) Woman’s “True” Profession: Voices from the History of Teaching. Old Westbury, New York: The Feminist Press; New York: McGraw-Hill. .
 Hoffman, Nancy; Howe, Florence, eds. (1979) Women Working: An Anthology of Stories and Poems. Old Westbury, New York: The Feminist Press; New York: McGraw-Hill. .
 Jensen, Joan M., ed. (1981) With These Hands: Women Working the Land. Old Westbury, New York: The Feminist Press; New York: McGraw-Hill. .
 Kessler-Harris, Alice (1981) Women Have Always Worked: A Historical Overview. Old Westbury, New York: The Feminist Press; New York: McGraw-Hill. .
 Nicholas, Susan Cary; Price, Alice M.; Rubin, Rachel (1979) Rights and Wrongs: Women’s Struggle for Legal Equality. Old Westbury, New York: The Feminist Press; New York: McGraw-Hill. .
 Romer, Nancy (1981) The Sex-Role Cycle: Socialization from Infancy to Old Age. Old Westbury, New York: The Feminist Press; New York: McGraw-Hill. .
 Sterling, Dorothy (1979) Black Foremothers: Three Lives. Old Westbury, New York: The Feminist Press; New York: McGraw-Hill. .
 Swerdlow, Amy; Bridenthal, Renate; Kelly, Joan; Vine, Phylis (1981) Household and Kin: Families in Flux. Old Westbury, New York: The Feminist Press; New York: McGraw-Hill. .
 Twin, Stephanie L., ed. (1979) Out of the Bleachers: Writings on Women and Sport. Old Westbury, New York: The Feminist Press; New York: McGraw-Hill. .

The Feminist Press also played a pioneering role in the nascent field of women's studies by providing curricular materials, bibliographies, directories, and a newsletter. The Clearinghouse on Women's Studies, established at the press, was the primary source of information until the National Women's Studies Association was founded in 1977.

In the summer of 1985, the Feminist Press moved to the CUNY Graduate Center campus on East Ninety-Fourth Street  in Manhattan, following an invitation from the school and was allowed to maintain an independent staff and board of directors.

In 2001, Jean Casella became the executive director of the press, followed by Gloria Jacobs, former Ms. Magazine editor, and writer Jennifer Baumgardner, cofounder of Soapbox, Inc, and later founder of Dottir Press. Jamia Wilson was the subsequent executive director of the Feminist Press, appointed in 2017, and was both the youngest director in the press's forty-nine-year history and the first woman of color to head the organization. “I grew up reading Feminist Press books from my mother’s shelf, and they were instrumental in developing my voice as an activist and writer. It’s an honor to join this intergenerational team to enliven the Press’s intersectional vision of publishing unapologetic, accessible texts that inspire action, teach empathy, and build community,” Wilson explained upon her appointment as ED. In 2022, Margot Atwell, formerly at Kickstarter, was appointed the newest executive director.

Notable publishing endeavors

In 2016, the press started Amethyst Editions, a queer imprint curated by Michelle Tea that champions emerging queer  and LGBT writers who employ genre-bending narratives and experimental writing styles, and complicates the conversation around American LGBTQ+ experiences beyond a coming out narrative. Tea's collection Against Memoir won the PEN/Diamonstein-Spielvogel Award for the Art of the Essay in 2019. Brontez Purnell, whose novel Since I Laid My Burden Down was also published by the Amethyst Editions imprint, received a Whiting Award for Fiction in 2018.

Love War Stories by Ivelisse Rodriguez was nominated for a PEN/Faulkner Award for Fiction in 2019.

The Feminist Press has also demonstrated a commitment to publishing diverse voices in translation. Among their recent bestselling translated titles are Asja Bakic's Mars, translated by Jennifer Zoble; Cristina Rivera Garza's The Iliac Crest, translated by Sarah Booker; and Armonía Somer's The Naked Woman, translated by Kit Maude. Pretty Things, a novel by Virginie Despentes that was translated from the French by Emma Ramadan, was longlisted for the 2019 Best Translated Book Award. Trifonia Melibea Obono's La Bastarda, translated by Lawrence Schimel and the first novel by a woman from Equatorial Guinea to be published in English, was shortlisted for the 2019 Lambda Literary Awards in the Lesbian Fiction category.

The Feminist Press also established the Louise Meriwether First Book Prize, a literary prize for debut women and nonbinary authors of color, in partnership with TAYO Literary Magazine. In 2017, YZ Chin became the first recipient of the Louise Meriwether First Book Prize for her short story collection Though I Get Home. The prize has since been awarded to Claudia D. Hernández in 2018 for Knitting the Fog and Melissa Valentine in 2019 for The Names of All the Flowers.

The Feminist Press won the 2020 Ivan Sandrof Lifetime Achievement Award at the National Book Critics Circle Awards.

WSQ: Women's Studies Quarterly 
The Feminist Press also publishes WSQ: Women's Studies Quarterly, an interdisciplinary peer-reviewed academic journal, based out of the City University of New York. The journal began as Women's Studies Newsletter in 1972, and in 1981 it was renamed Women's Studies Quarterly. Today it is a biannual release simply called WSQ. Covering a wide array of thematic subjects within emerging women's studies, the journal has published issues such as "Technologies," "Citizenship," and "Motherhood." The subject of each issue is considered through various lenses, including psychoanalytic, legal, queer, and historical interpretations in addition to many others.

Notable authors and titles 

 
 
Oakley, Mary Ann B. (1972). Elizabeth Cady Stanton. Old Westbury, New York: The Feminist Press. .
Ehrenreich, Barbara; English, Deirdre (1973). Witches, Midwives, & Nurses: a history of women healers (1st ed.). Old Westbury, New York: The Feminist Press. .
Ehrenreich, Barbara; English, Deirdre (1973). Complaints and Disorders: the sexual politics of sickness. Old Westbury, New York: The Feminist Press. .

Smedley, Agnes (1973). Daughter of Earth. Old Westbury, New York: The Feminist Press. .
Widerberg, Siv (1973). I'm Like Me: Poems for people who want to grow up equal. Translated by Verne Moberg. Old Westbury, New York: The Feminist Press. .
Chopin, Kate (1974). The Storm and Other Stories. Edited and with an introduction by Per Seyersted. Old Westbury, New York: The Feminist Press. OCLC 3104145.
Freeman, Mary Eleanor Wilkins (1974). The Revolt of Mother and Other Stories. Afterword by Michele Clark. Old Westbury, New York: The Feminist Press. .
Klein, Norma (1974). A Train for Jane. Illustrated by Miriam Schottland. Old Westbury, New York: The Feminist Press. .
Mason, Bobbie Ann (1975). The Girl Sleuth: a feminist guide. Old Westbury, New York: The Feminist Press. OCLC 1154562966.
Chevigny, Belle Gale (1976). The Woman and the Myth: Margaret Fuller’s life and writings. Old Westbury, New York: The Feminist Press. .
Kearns, Martha (1976). Käthe Kollwitz: woman and artist. Old Westbury, New York: The Feminist Press. .
Maury, Inez (1976). My Mother the Mail Carrier/Mi Mamá la Cartera. Translated by Norah E. Alemany. Illustrated by Lady McCrady. Old Westbury, New York: The Feminist Press. .
Smedley, Agnes (1976). Portraits of Chinese Women in Revolution. Old Westbury, New York: The Feminist Press. .
Rosen, Ruth; Davidson, Sue eds. (1977). The Maimie Papers. Old Westbury, New York: The Feminist Press. Published with The Schlesinger Library, Radcliffe College, Cambridge, Massachusetts. .
Phelps, Ethel Johnston (1978). Tatterhood and Other Tales: stories of magic and adventure. Illustrated by Pamela Baldwin Ford. Old Westbury, New York: The Feminist Press. OCLC 1036888564.
Showalter, Elaine ed. (1978). These Modern Women: autobiographical essays from the twenties. Old Westbury, New York: The Feminist Press. .
Wilson, Michael (1978). Salt of the Earth: A screenplay. Commentary by Deborah Silverton Rosenfelt. Old Westbury, New York: The Feminist Press. OCLC 1036858969.
Hurston, Zora Neale (1979). I Love Myself When I Am Laughing . . . And Then Again When I Am Looking Mean and Impressive: a Zora Neale Hurston reader. Edited by Alice Walker. Old Westbury, New York: The Feminist Press. .
Irwin, Hadley (1979). The Lilith Summer. Old Westbury, New York: The Feminist Press. .
Marshall, Paule (1981). Brown Girl, Brownstones. Old Westbury, New York: The Feminist Press. .
 
 
 
 
Reprinted:

Series 
The Feminist Press has launched multiple book series.  Women Writing Africa was begun in 1994 with funding from the Ford and Rockefeller Foundations, and the four-volume series was completed in 2009.  Like the two-volume Women Writing India, the series is composed of regionally unique women's literature.  The Femmes Fatales series, featuring pulp, mystery, and noir novels by women writing in the 1930s, '40s, and '50s was launched in 2003.

2X2 Series
Classic Feminist Writers
Contemporary Classics by Women
The Defiant Muse
Femmes Fatales: Women Write Pulp 
The Helen Rose Scheuer Jewish Women's Series
Jewish Women Writers
Women Changing the World
Women's Lives, Women's Work
Women Writing Africa Project
Women Writing in India
Women Writing the Middle East
Women Writing Science
Ordinary Terrible Things
Amethyst Editions
Drag Queen Story Hour
Feminist Folktales from Around the World

See also
 List of feminist literature
 List of lesbian fiction
 LGBT Literature
 $pread
 Lambda Literary

Notes

References 

The Feminist Press (1988). The Feminist Press 1970-1985: A Birthday Book. New York.

External links 
 The Feminist Press

Advocacy groups in the United States
Book publishing companies based in New York (state)
Feminist literature
Feminism in New York City
Literary publishing companies
Non-profit organizations based in New York (state)
Non-profit publishers
Publishing companies established in 1970
Small press publishing companies
Political book publishing companies
Feminist book publishing companies
1970 establishments in New York City